Aurora Public Schools may refer to:

 Aurora Public Schools (Colorado)
 East Aurora Public School District 131, Aurora, Illinois
 West Aurora Public School District 129, Aurora, Illinois